Baran is a city in Baran district of the Indian state of Rajasthan. It is a municipality and the district headquarters of Baran district, famous for its 11th century Bhand Devra Temple on banks of Ramgarh crater. It is 339km from the state capital Jaipur near Kota city. Three large rivers, Parban, Parbati, and Kalisindh, flow through the district.

Baran district has eight tehsils: Antah, Atru, Baran, Chhabra, Chhipabarod, Kishanganj, Mangrol, and Shahabad

History
The old name of Baran is Varah Nagari and Annapurna Nagari. During the Gupta Empire and later, it was under the rule of Yaudheya rulers and Tomar rulers, ruling from Baran kot in modern Bulandshahar in Uttar Pradesh. There's a caste called Baranwal descended from these rulers and their soldiers. By the 17th century, Mughals gained control over the city. The Shahabad Fort of Baran was built by the Mughals and even Aurangzeb visited the fort. It is a city located in southeastern Rajasthan, a state in northern India. Baran was one of the districts in the new joint Rajasthan, that was formed on April 10, 1948. The district was named after Baran city. It is located about 300 kilometres south of the state capital, Jaipur.

Geography
It has an average elevation of 262 metres (859 ft). It is surrounded by three Rivers Kalisindh, Parvati and Parban. The city is situated on the border of Rajasthan and Madhya Pradesh.

Climate

The city has a dry climate except in the monsoon seasons. The winter season runs from mid of November to February and summer season runs from March to mid of June. The period from mid of June to September is the monsoon season followed by the months October to mid of November constitute the post-monsoon or the retreating monsoon. The average rainfall in the district is 895.2 mm. January is the coldest month with the average daily maximum temperature of 24.3 °C and the average daily minimum temperature of 10.6 °C.

Culture 
As Rajasthan is well known for its culture and heritage,  (festivals), "Rang-Rangeelo Rajasthan", Baran is famous for its special carnival or fair named , which is celebrated for 15 to 20 days after .

Transport 

The city is connected with neighbouring districts and with major cities outside the state.

Road
National Highway No. 76 (now National Highway No. 27) passes through the district. National Highway No. 76 (now National Highway No. 27) is a part of East-West Corridor.

Train
 station is situated on Kota-Bina section of Western Central Railways. It is about 67 km from Kota Junction.

Air
The nearest major airports are located at Jaipur International Airport, Udaipur Airport, and Jodhpur Airport. These airports connect Rajasthan with the major cities of India such as Delhi and Mumbai.

Tourism
Fort of Shergarh, Gugor Fort, Ramgarh crater, and Kapildhara waterfall attracts many tourist every year.
Moreover, Sitabadi (Danta-Kelwara) is a Hindu religious place (pilgrim) in Baran with many pure cisterns. It is considered that goddess Sita stayed there during her  and the place is considered for the birth of Luv-kush (sons of lord Ram).

Hadoti Panorama complex
Hadoti Panorama complex has been built in village Gajanpura near to Baran, to showcase the history of Hadoti. Red stones of Mount Banshipur of Karauli and White stones of Bundi are used as building material. Jharokha and Chatri are built by craftsman from Karauli. History and contribution in development of four districts Kota, Bundi, Jhalawar and Baran will be displayed. District's historical places like Kakoni, Bilasgarh, Bhand-Devra, Gargach Temple and Forts of Hadoti, will be showcased. In compound hall thematic audio and video are availed to the public.

Cuisine
Typical dishes include [(kat bapla )Dal bati churma|Dal Baati Churma]], Roti (chapati), Raabdi and samosas.

See also
Chhabra
Antah
Atru
Mangrol

References

Cities and towns in Baran district